Élder Herrera Cortes (born 28 December 1968) is a Colombian former road cyclist.

Major results

1992
 1st overall Vuelta al Valle del Cauca
1995
 7th overall Clásico RCN
 9th overall Vuelta a Colombia
1999
 1st overall Vuelta a Mendoza
2000
 2nd overall Vuelta a Colombia
1st stage 12
 2nd overall Clásico RCN
1st stage 9
2001
 3rd overall Clásico RCN
2002
 1st overall Vuelta al Tolima
 2nd overall Vuelta a Colombia
 3rd Road race, National Road Championships
 4th overall Clásico RCN
1st stage 7
2003
 1st  Road race, National Road Championships
 1st stage 3 Clasica Integración de la Guadua-Gobernación de Risaralda
 1st stage 2 Vuelta a Boyacá
2004
 2nd overall Doble Sucre Potosí GP Cemento Fancesa
 1st stage 7 Vuelta de Higuito
2005
 2nd individual pursuit, National Track Championships
2006
 4th overall Clásico RCN
1st stage 7
2007
 1st stage 3 (TTT) & 11 Vuelta a Chiriquí
 5th overall Clásico RCN
2009
 1st prologue (TTT) Vuelta a Colombia

References
 

1968 births
Living people
Sportspeople from Cali
Colombian male cyclists
Colombian sportspeople in doping cases
Doping cases in cycling
Vuelta a Colombia stage winners
20th-century Colombian people
21st-century Colombian people